The Chongzhen calendar or Shixian calendar was a historical edition of the lunisolar Chinese calendar from 1645 to 1913. It was developed by the lead of Xu Guangqi with the assistance of the Jesuit scholars Johann Schreck and Johann Adam Schall von Bell from 1624 to 1644, and was dedicated to the Chongzhen Emperor. When he died a year after it was released, it was propagated in the first year of the Qing dynasty by the Shunzhi Emperor, who changed its name to Shíxiàn calendar. 

This calendar is notable for systematically introducing the concepts and development of European mathematics and astronomy to China for the first time, and constituted the first major collaboration between scientists from Europe and from the Far East. Documented in more than 100 volumes of books, It offered an encyclopedic account of Euclidean geometry, spherical geometry and trigonometry, with extensive translations and references to Euclid's Elements and the works of Nicolaus Copernicus, Johannes Kepler, Galileo Galilei, and Tycho Brahe, whose Tychonic system was used its main theoretical basis. In addition, a comprehensive set of mathematical tables  and astronomical ephemerides was included.

The main changes introduced by the calendar are:
 Replacement of the original "平氣法" solar term system (based on dividing a tropical year equally) with one based on the ecliptic longitude of the sun ("定氣法").
 Placement of intercalary months changed to accommodate the changes in the solar term system.

This calendar was used from the early Qing period into the early modern era, but was modified and replaced in 1914 and again in 1928, with various minor modifications since then. In 1928, it was put under the management of Purple Mountain Observatory (Zijinshan Astronomical Observatory), thus the present version is popularly referenced to as the Zijin calendar. All of these editions were based on modern astronomical data. In the People's Republic of China, it has been officially standardized as GB/T 33661-2017, "Calculation and Promulgation of the Chinese Calendar", issued by the Standardization Administration of China on May 12, 2017.

References

Xu Guangqi
Specific calendars

>>[Aslaksen10] Aslaksen, Helmer, "Mathematics of the Chinese calendar" (PDF) (July 17, 2010), Department of Mathematics, National University of Singapore (now at University of Oslo).

>> Liú, Bǎolín (劉寶琳), 《100年袖珍干支月曆》 (Pocket Edition of 100-Year Chinese Calendar), 商務印書館(香港) (The Commercial Press, Hong Kong), 1993.

>>Liu, Baolin and Stephenson, F. Richard, "The Chinese calendar and its operational rules", Orion: Zeitschrift für Amateur-Astronomie, 56, 16-19, 1998.

>> Liu, Baolin and Stephenson, F. Richard, "A brief contemporary history of the Chinese calendar", Orion: Zeitschrift für Amateur-Astronomie, 56, 33-38, 1998.

>>《农历的编算和颁行》("Calculation and promulgation of the Chinese calendar"), revised version (June 28, 2017), issued jointly by General Administration of Quality Supervision, Inspection and Quarantine of the People's Republic of China and Standardization Administration of the People's Republic of China, drafted by Purple Mountain Observatory. PDF version of the draft can be downloaded here;

>>"国家标准《农历的编算和颁行》解读材料" ("Explanatory material for 'Calculation and promulgation of the Chinese calendar'"), Purple Mountain Observatory, Chinese Academy of Science.

>>《新编万年历（修定本）》 (New Edition of Wànniánlì, revised edition), edited by 中国科学院紫金山天文台 (Purple Mountain Observatory, CAS), 科学普及出版社 (Popular Science Press), 1986.

>> Richards, E.G., in Section 15.8 of Explanatory Supplement to the Astronomical Almanac, ed. by S.E. Urban and P.K. Seidelmann, third edition, University Science Books, Mill Valley, California (2013).

>>Táng, Hànliáng (唐汉良), 历书百问百答 (Calendars: 100 Questions and Answers), 江苏科学技术出版社 (Jiangsu Science & Technology press), 1986.